Hoosier Prairie is a unit of Indiana Dunes National Park in Lake County, Indiana. It began in the 1970s as wasteland that conservation organization found of a unique interest. The area was designated a National Natural Landmark in 1974  and a State Nature Preserve in 1977  The sandy soil creates a variety of habitats, from oak barrens, wet prairie, including sedge meadows and prairie marshes. More than 350 native species of vascular plants have been identified. A minimum of 43 species are uncommon in the State of Indiana.

Description
Wheelchair accessible  The first  is considered to be wheelchair accessible.  It is a wide gravel path.  You can travel partway into the prairie, along the 'old field' restoration area on the west.  A line of trees on the east open to provide views into the prairie marsh.

The trails into the prairie are chipped bark pathways, which can have the surrounding grasses and forbs leaning across them. They are only a single file track in width and not suitable for walkers or persons walking side by side.

Prairie marsh trail is a  circular trail from just beyond the midpoint of the accessible trail back to the end of the accessible trail.

Savanna trail is  circular trail from the eastern edge of the Prairie marsh trail, returning to the same point on the marsh trail.

Location
The prairie is located on West Main Street, Griffith, Indiana.  The area is accessible from a parking lot on Main Street (E 53rd St) just east of Kennedy Avenue.  A trail, leads off through the prairie to the east.

Wildlife and plants
Rare habitats exist in the Hoosier Prairie Preserve, including the dry black oak barrens, wetland pools, and moist prairies. The areas support over 350 native plants. Of these, 43 are uncommon or rarely seen within Indiana. These rare plants include the white wild indigo, prairie parsley, Indian paintbrush, rose pogonia and the tall Indian grass. Some unusual creatures seen in the prairie include the red-headed woodpecker, sedge wrens and the brown butterfly. Among the prairie "potholes', which hold water most of the year, there will be reptiles and amphibians.

Restoration
The field where the parking lot is located along Main Street, south and west towards Kennedy Avenue is an old wheat field. It was purchased as a buffer for the prairie. With little assistance, the field has begun to revert to native prairie. Prairie maintenance is dependent upon a natural regime of fire, which has been suppressed in this urban area. Therefore, the Indiana Department of Natural Resources has assisted the regeneration by mechanically removing trees, woody brush and implementing 'prescribed fires'. Evidence of the success of the restoration can be seen in the increase in prairie indicator plants and birds:

Flora (Plants)
Big bluestem
Tall coreopsis
Goldenrod
Asters

Fauna (specifically birds)
Meadowlarks
Sparrows
Goldfinch
Bobolink

Prairie marsh trail
The Prairie Marsh trail is a  loop trail that passes through two habitats, a tallgrass prairie and a marsh. This area is considered a virgin prairie as it has never been tilled or grazed. Both the prairie and the marsh are dependent upon fire to maintain their openness and diversity of plant life. The prairie continues to exist because the plants have adapted to fire by developing roots structures that survive underground as the fire sweeps across the surface removing woody and non-prairie plants. The specialized root structures include rhizomes, bulbs, corms, and tubers.

Indicator Species

Big bluestem
Indian grass
White wild indigo

Wild quinine
Rattlesnake master
Leadplant

Savanna trail
The Savanna trail is a  loop trail from the eastern edge of the Marsh trail. This habitat mimics the pine savannas in the Northern Woods allowing brackens and sweetferns to thrive amid the prairie vegetation.  This is an Oak Savanna with widely spaced trees, predominately oaks surrounded by an understory of wildflowers and grasses.  These savannas can survive through droughts because the oaks and the prairie plants have taproots that reach down to the water table. Beyond the oaks is an open 'wet prairie' which includes a variety species that are more common in wetlands than prairies.

Indicator Species

Savanna
Sweetfern
Bracken
Black oaks
White oaks

lowlands or wet prairie
Prairie cordgrass
Bluejoint grass
Sedges
Pink orchid
Marsh blazing starr
Prairie sundrops
marsh phlox - Phlox glaberrima

See also
Cowles Bog
Pinhook Bog
Indiana Dunes National Park
Indiana Dunes State Park

References

External links
 Indiana State Nature Preserves
 Indiana Dunes National Park

Indiana Dunes National Park
Protected areas of Lake County, Indiana
National Natural Landmarks in Indiana
Nature reserves in Indiana
1970s establishments in Indiana
Protected areas established in the 1970s